The African Caribbean Medical Society (ACMS) is a British organization founded in 1981 by a group of black doctors.

The ACMS was founded in March 1981 by doctors including Lord Pitt of Hampstead, Dr Adams, Dr Eddie Simon and Franklyn Jacobs. It aimed to be a support network for black doctors, and a forum for focus on health matters relevant to British African-Caribbean people. As Franklyn Jacobs recalled:

References

Organizations established in 1981
1981 establishments in England
Medical associations based in the United Kingdom
Ethnic organisations based in the United Kingdom